Schmidl is a German surname. Notable people with the surname include:

Peter Schmidl (born 1942), Austrian classical clarinetist
Ulrich Schmidl (1510–1579), German Landsknecht, conquistador, explorer, chronicler and councilman

See also 

Schmiedel
Dovid Schmidel

German-language surnames